Carex cirrhulosa is a tussock-forming species of perennial sedge in the family Cyperaceae. It is native to parts of the  Philippines.

See also
List of Carex species

References

cirrhulosa
Plants described in 1854
Taxa named by Christian Gottfried Daniel Nees von Esenbeck
Flora of the Philippines